Imbros and Tenedos, also known by their official names since 1970 of Gökçeada and Bozcaada, are two neighboring North Aegean islands which belong to Turkey. They form the districts of Gökçeada and Bozcaada, in Çanakkale Province.

They are or have been treated or considered together for various purposes at different times:
 in the Treaty of Lausanne of 1923, which awarded them to Turkey, under special provisions for their Greek population
 in a 2008 Council of Europe report
 as a Metropolis of the Ecumenical Patriarchate of Constantinople

References

Further reading
Reading piece in French  

Islands of Turkey
Dioceses of the Ecumenical Patriarchate of Constantinople
Aftermath of World War I in Turkey
Greece–Turkey relations
North Aegean islands
Dardanelles